The 2016 Toyota/Save Mart 350 was a NASCAR Sprint Cup Series stock car race held on June 26, 2016 at Sonoma Raceway in Sonoma, California. Contested over 110 laps on the  road course, it was the 16th race of the 2016 NASCAR Sprint Cup Series.

The race had 12 lead changes among different cautions and 4 cautions for 10 laps. This was three-time series champion Tony Stewart's 49th and final career victory.

Background 

Sonoma Raceway, formerly Sears Point Raceway and Infineon Raceway is a  road course and drag strip located on the landform known as Sears Point in the southern Sonoma Mountains in Sonoma, California, USA. It is host to one of only two NASCAR Sprint Cup Series races each year that are run on road courses (the other being Watkins Glen International in Watkins Glen, New York). It is also host to the Verizon IndyCar Series and several other auto races and motorcycle races such as the American Federation of Motorcyclists series. Sonoma Raceway continues to host amateur, or club racing events which may or may not be open to the general public. The largest such car club is the Sports Car Club of America.

Entry list 
The preliminary entry list for the race included forty-one cars and was released on June 3, 2016 at 12:29 pm ET.

Practice

First practice 

Final practice 

Qualifying 

He said that his pole lap "was amazing, the car was really good and then I wasn’t sure about the second lap. It was good enough and that tells you how good the car is. I just can’t say enough about Stanley and all the things they’re doing for us. We had a dinner last night for us and this will be really exciting for them to have their Stanley Toyota up on the pole for the start of the race and hopefully we can stay there and get another win.”

A. J. Allmendinger, who qualified second, said when he "saw Carl's first lap, I was like, I don't care what kind of lap I run, I'm never going to catch that. There's no pressure on me. He's won here before (in 2014); my best finish is seventh. We just have to go out and have a solid day." “Definitely a big gain from where we were yesterday,” he added. “We’ve still got to go to work, we’ve still got to figure out race trim, but a good start at least.”

Dylan Lupton qualified 38th in his Sprint Cup Series debut. Cody Ware failed to qualify for the race.

Qualifying results

Race

First half 
Under clear blue California skies, Carl Edwards led the field to the green flag at 3:22 p.m. The first caution of the race flew on the seventh lap after Clint Bowyer's car came to a halt in the esses after the wiring in the dashboard caught fire. He said afterwards that the issue was probably "the ignition; it was a wiring fire. I've had oil smoke and stuff like that pour into the car … I've never had an electrical fire. Damn, it choked me out, I couldn't breathe. I bailed out and the damn thing starts rolling so I had to reach in and put it in gear. That's a great start to the day." He would go on to finish 40th.

The race restarted on lap 8. A. J. Allmendinger passed Edwards climbing up turn 2 to take the lead. After 10 laps, his lead had only grown to close to a second over Edwards. A number of cars started hitting pit road on lap 20. Jamie McMurray was tagged for speeding and was forced to serve a pass through penalty. Allmendinger made his stop on lap 25 and handed the lead to Paul Menard. Kevin Harvick out-braked Menard going into turn 4a to take the lead on lap 28. He pitted on lap 31 and the lead cycled to Edwards.

A number of cars began pitting on lap 45. Debris in turn 1 brought out the second caution of the race on lap 46. Kyle Busch opted to stay out when most of the field pitted and assumed the lead.

Second half 

The race restarted with 61 laps to go. Denny Hamlin drove to the outside of his teammate in the esses to take the lead with 60 laps to go. A number of cars began pitting with 42 laps to go. Kyle Larson was tagged for speeding on pit road and was forced to serve a pass through penalty. Hamlin pitted with 39 laps to go and handed the lead to Allmendinger. Both drivers pitted the next lap and handed the lead to Danica Patrick. Michael McDowell was tagged for an uncontrolled tire and was forced to serve a pass through penalty. Hamlin took back the lead from Patrick passing to her outside at the top of turn 2.

Debris in turn 7a brought out the third caution of the race with 24 laps to go. Tony Stewart opted to stay out when the leaders pitted and assumed the lead. Allmendinger was tagged for an uncontrolled tire and restarted the race from the tail end of the field, to which he sarcastically told his crew "Good job, guys."

The race restarted with 20 laps to go. The fourth caution of the race flew with 18 laps to go after McDowell's car stalled off the track near turn 9.

The race restarted with 14 laps to go. Martin Truex Jr. attempted to out-brake Stewart going into turn 7a with 12 laps to go, but he carried too much speed and had to stay on the brakes longer. This allowed Hamlin to pass him for second. In the remaining laps, Hamlin attempted to run down and pass Stewart to no avail. On the final lap, however, Hamlin out-braked Stewart going into turn 7a and took the lead. At turn 11, he locked the brakes and left the inside line open. Stewart drove his car into the gap, sent Hamlin and himself into the wall and drove on to score the victory.

Post-race

Driver comments
Stewart said after the race that with "eight to go it was the first time I thought, 'hey, we might actually have a shot to hold onto this,' and I actually got a little bit emotional thinking about it while I was driving," Stewart said. "But you stay so focused and you have to. That was when they got racing each other and there was a bit of a gap and I had a little bit of a breather there to kind of think that once Denny (Hamlin) got closing in, it was back to business. You didn't have time to think about wine and flowers and ponies and all that stuff. I had to get back to business. But it was nice."

Hamlin said afterwards that his "car was the worst it was all day. I didn’t have any forward drive (on turn 11). I didn’t run a low enough line. Once I knew he had position, I knew he wasn’t going to leave it to chance and have a drag race."

Race results

Race summary
 Lead changes: 12 among different drivers
 Cautions/Laps: 4 for 10
 Red flags: 0         
 Time of race: 2 hours, 42 minutes, and 13 seconds
 Average speed:

Media

Television 
Fox NASCAR televised the race in the United States on FS1 for the second consecutive year. Mike Joy was the lap-by-lap announcer, while six-time Sonoma winner Jeff Gordon and Darrell Waltrip were the color commentators. Jamie Little, Chris Neville and Matt Yocum reported from pit lane during the race.

Radio 
Radio coverage of the race was broadcast by Performance Racing Network. PRN's broadcast of the race was simulcasted on Sirius XM NASCAR Radio. Doug Rice, Mark Garrow and Wendy Venturini announced the race in the booth while the field was racing on the pit straight. Pat Patterson called the race from a stand outside of turn 2 when the field was racing up turns 2, 3 and 3a. Brad Gillie called the race from a stand outside of turn 7a when the field was racing through turns 4a and 7a. The field came back into the view of the booth in turns 8 and 9. Rob Albright called the race from a billboard outside turn 11 when the field was racing through turns 10 and 11. Heather DeBeaux, Brett McMillan, Jim Noble and Steve Richards reported from pit lane during the race.

Standings after the race

Note: Only the first 16 positions are included for the driver standings.. – Driver has clinched a position in the Chase for the Sprint Cup.

References 

Toyota Save Mart 350
Toyota Save Mart 350
NASCAR races at Sonoma Raceway
Toyota Save Mart 350